Alfred Cox may refer to:
Alfred Cox (politician) (1825–1911), New Zealand politician
Alfred W. Cox (1857–1919), British racehorse owner and breeder